Set theoretic programming is a programming paradigm based on mathematical set theory. One example of a programming language based on this paradigm is SETL.  The goal of set theoretic programming is to improve programmer speed and productivity significantly, and also enhance program clarity and readability.

Languages With Set-Based Operators 
 Bandicoot
 Claire
 LINQ - Extensions to .NET languages such as C#, F#, and VB.NET
 Matlab
 Miranda
 SQL
 SETL

References 

Programming paradigms